P64 may refer to:

Aviation
 Boulton & Paul P.64 Mailplane, a British transport biplane
 Kirksville Air Force Station, a closed United States Air Force radar station
 North American P-64, an American fighter aircraft
 Partenavia P.64 Oscar, an Italian light aircraft

Vessels
 , a submarine of the Royal Navy
 , a corvette of the Indian Navy
 , an offshore patrol vessel of the Irish Naval Service

Other uses
 FB P-64, a Polish semi-automatic pistol
 Magdalen papyrus, a biblical manuscript
 P64 road (Ukraine)
 P64, a state regional road in Latvia